Burbage Wood and Aston Firs is a  biological Site of Special Scientific Interest  Leicestershire.

Overview 
These semi-natural woods on poorly drained soils are dominated by ash and oak. Hazel and hawthorn are common in the shrub layer, and there are flowers such as sweet woodruff and water avens.

There is public access to Burbage Wood, but Aston Firs is private.

Burbage Wood is part of Burbage Common and Woods, an 85 hectare Local Nature Reserve. The nature reserve is owned by Hinckley and Bosworth Borough Council who manage it as a nature reserve and a public park. The Common is unimproved heath-grassland and is historically common land. Such heathland was common in this area until land use changes in the 19th century.

References

Local Nature Reserves in Leicestershire
Sites of Special Scientific Interest in Leicestershire
Country parks in Leicestershire
Hinckley and Bosworth
Common land in England